Teresa Iżewska (8 April 1933 – 26 August 1982) was a Polish actress. She appeared in ten films between 1957 and 1982.

She was buried at the Łostowicki cemetery in Gdańsk.

Selected filmography
 Kanał (1957)
 Rancho Texas (1959)
 Baza ludzi umarlych (1959) - Translated: "Depot of the Dead" - Written by: Marek Hłasko 
 Nafta (1961)
 Spotkanie w "Bajce" (1962)
 Mansarda (1963)
 Kryptonim Nektar (1963)
 Rozwodów nie bedzie (1964)
 Podróz za jeden usmiech (TV Mini Series) (1972)
 Odwet (1983)

References

External links

1933 births
1982 deaths
1982 suicides
Polish film actresses
Actresses from Warsaw
Suicides in Poland